Joan de Noailles, Dowager Duchess of Mouchy (née Joan Douglas Dillon, later Princess Charles of Luxembourg; born January 31, 1935) is an American-born French duchess, the first commoner to marry into the reigning dynasty of Luxembourg, and is the former president of French Bordeaux wine company Domaine Clarence Dillon.

Biography
Joan Dillon is the daughter of U.S. Treasury Secretary C. Douglas Dillon and his wife,  Phyllis Chess Ellsworth. She came to live in Paris, France, with her family when her father was appointed American Ambassador in the 1950s. She initially found work with the Paris Review.

After her marriage to Prince Charles of Luxembourg she discovered an interest in wine and the family interest in Haut-Brion. From 1975 to 2008, Joan Dillon held the presidency of Domaine Clarence Dillon. Her husband, Philippe de Noailles, Duc de Mouchy, was general manager. Under their direction the company bought Château La Mission Haut-Brion, Château Laville Haut-Brion and Château La Tour Haut-Brion in 1983. In 2008, Prince Robert of Luxembourg, her son by her marriage to Prince Charles of Luxembourg, became president of Domaine Clarence Dillon.

Wine Enthusiast Magazine describes Dillon as "a larger-than-life lady, with an indefinable, cultured, mid-Atlantic accent."

Family 
Dillon married firstly in Paris, France, on 1 August 1953 James Brady Moseley, nephew of U.S. Treasury Secretary Nicholas F. Brady. The couple divorced in Washoe County, Nevada, US, on 12 December 1955; the marriage was annulled in Rome, Italy, on 22 June 1963. They had a daughter, Joan Dillon Moseley (born 1954).

Dillon married secondly on 1 March 1967 Prince Charles, brother of Grand Duke Jean of Luxembourg, at the Catholic Church of St. Edward the Confessor in Sutton Park, Surrey, UK. The marriage was the first authorized of a Luxembourgeois prince to a commoner – authorized by Grand Ducal decree issued 16 February 1967. She was styled "Her Royal Highness Princess Joan of Luxembourg". Prince Charles died in Imbarcati, Province of Pistoia, Italy, on 26 July 1977. They had two children:
Princess Charlotte of Luxembourg (born New York City, 1967) 
Prince Robert of Luxembourg (born Fischbach Castle, Luxembourg, 1968)

Dillon married thirdly in Islesboro, Maine, on 3 August 1978 Philippe, 8th Duke de Mouchy (1922–2011). The marriage was without issue.

References

External links 
Ancestry of Joan Douglas Dillon

1935 births
Living people
American emigrants to France
Joan
Dukes of Mouchy
House of Noailles
French winemakers